Chlamys zeelandona is a bivalve mollusc of the family Pectinidae.

References
 Powell A. W. B., New Zealand Mollusca, William Collins Publishers Ltd, Auckland, New Zealand 1979 

Bivalves of New Zealand
Molluscs described in 1931
Taxa named by Leo George Hertlein
zeelandona